Asia Muhammad and Taylor Townsend were the defending champions, but Muhammad chose to participate at the 2015 Open GDF Suez de Cagnes-sur-Mer Alpes-Maritimes instead. Townsend partnered Maria Sanchez and successfully defended her title, defeating Angelina Gabueva and Alexandra Stevenson in the final, 6–0, 6–1.

Seeds

Draw

References 
 Draw

Revolution Technologies Pro Tennis Classic - Doubles